Bolsena Lacus is one of a number of hydrocarbon lakes found on Saturn's largest moon, Titan.

Bolsena Lacus is located near the north pole of Titan, centered on latitude 75.75°N and longitude 10.28°W, and measures 101 km in length. It is situated in a north polar region where the majority of Titan's large lakes are found.

The lake is composed of liquid methane and ethane, and was detected by the Cassini space probe. It was named in 2007 after Lake Bolsena in Italy.

Notes

References

External links
 USGS labelled synthetic aperture radar map of Titan's north polar region

Lakes of Titan (moon)